Kingston is a rural municipality in Prince Edward Island, Canada. It is located within Queens County to the west of Charlottetown. The community is mainly farms with a small residential area.

Demographics 

Government 
Local government in Kingston is in the form of a seven-member community council with a chair. The council sits at Cornwall Post Office in Cornwall, Prince Edward Island.

Provincially, the area is covered by the following three districts with a MLA representing each:
West Royalty-Springvale;
Cornwall-Meadowbank; and
Kellys Cross-Cumberland.

At the federal level, it is located within the riding of Charlottetown.

Attractions 
Kingston United Church c. 1863

Transportation 
The main roads in Kingston is Kingston Road (Route 235 (Prince Edward Island)) and Bannockburn Road (Route 247 (Prince Edward Island)) are secondary provincial highways. The closest airport is Charlottetown Airport and there are no railway lines as they are not found in the province.

References 

Communities in Queens County, Prince Edward Island
Rural municipalities in Prince Edward Island